Usta is a genus of moths in the family Saturniidae first described by Hans Daniel Johan Wallengren in 1863.

Species
Usta alba Terral & Lequeux, 1991
Usta angulata Rothschild, 1895
Usta biplaga Rebel, 1912
Usta grantae Terral & Lequeux, 1991
Usta subangulata Bouvier, 1930
Usta terpsichore (Maassen & Weyding, 1885)
Usta wallengrenii (C. Felder & R. Felder, 1859)

References